Ute Mahler (née Schirmer; born 1949) is a German photographer. Between 2000 and 2015, she was a professor of photography at Hamburg University of Applied Sciences.

Biography

Provenance and early years 
Her birth came three weeks after the region administered as the Soviet occupation zone was rebranded and relaunched as the Soviet sponsored German Democratic Republic (East Germany). It was in the German Democratic Republic that Schirmer grew up and, for nearly two decades, built a successful career as a photographer. Many of the well judged photographs, mainly of people, for which she is celebrated today were produced during that period, in the full knowledge that there was very little likelihood that they would ever be seen by anyone other than the photographer and her friends. In East Germany she would be known to the public primarily as a fashion photographer.

Ludwig Schirmer (1929–2001), her father, had recently qualified as a miller and at the time of her birth worked in the village mill. He was also a passionate and talented amateur photographer, taking pictures of family and friends, weddings and other celebrations in the village. He had already by this time undertaken some paid photographic commissions in Thuringia, photographing agricultural machinery for a local tractor factory, but the move was nevertheless something of a leap in the dark. His pictures - at least the ones for which he was paid - were highly stylised and glossy publicity images, following the fashions of those times. There were pictures of combine harvesters, party officials and, his daughter would later recall, "hundreds of orchestral conductors". Increasingly successful commercially, Ludwig Schirmer was delighted that his daughter seemed to share his joy in photography, repeatedly insisting, "Ute, you're a [natural] photographer". Ute knew she could never be an "establishment photographer" of publicity images, and was totally unaware of her father's (secret) portfolio of private work:  as a teenager she therefore rejected his encouragement. When she took pictures it was not in contemplation of a career in the visual arts, but because she felt herself driven to capture truth and reality.

Student years 
After successfully completing her school career Ute Schirmer moved on to take an unpaid internship, which was a frequent prerequisite for university-level education in the German Democratic Republic, which had been left with a desperate shortage of working-age population thanks to the slaughter of war and mass emigration to the west during (especially) the 1950s. Based in Berlin, the DEWAG had branches across the country, and was responsible for various types of public information board and posters. In 1969 she enrolled at the "Hochschule für Grafik und Buchkunst" (loosely, "Fine Arts Academy") in Leipzig, emerging in 1974 with a degree in photography. While studying at the Leipzig academy, in 1972, Ute Schirmer teamed up with her near contemporary at Leipzig, Werner Mahler. It was the start of an active professional partnership lasting more than forty years. Shortly after she graduated, Ute Schirmer married Werner Mahler. The couple's son was born in 1975.

Freelancer 
Although only a few months older than her husband, Werner Mahler had enrolled at the "Hochschule" four years later, and was therefore still less than halfway through his course in 1974/5 when Ute Mahler embarked on her professional career. She earned her living as a fashion photographer, working principally for Sibylle, the bimonthly East German fashion and arts magazine, based initially in Berlin and latterly in Leipzig, which over a long period frequently achieved circulation figures in excess of 200,000.   As a freelancer she also contributed fashion images to other publications including, after 1990, the Hamburg-based weekly mass-circulation news magazine  Stern.   During the East German phase of her career censorship became part of life, but whether through self-censorship or through the way her images resonated with the authorities, Mahler generally carried the censorship burden relatively lightly.   But there was the fashion shoot for which she decided to photograph her model on a construction site, surrounded by a form of wire cage.   Her editor refused to publish the image:  when she asked why not she received only the reply: "You know why not".   She did.   Sibylle's popularity with readers and focus on fashion may have ensured a measure of respect from the authorities which would not have extended to more obviously political publication.   It did publish plenty of pictures which keen eyed readers could readily have construed as "political", but as Maher later explained to an interviewer, "...you have to be able to read images. Few of those in power could do that. And if someone found something, we could always say: I don’t understand, the picture only shows ... this and that. They had to show that the symbolic aspect of a photo was intended the way it could be understood."

She also raised her public profile as the "portraitist of the eastern rockers", producing all the "official" photo-portraits of Tamara Danz and Danz' rock group Silly through the 1980s.   In 2014 that earned her plaudits from a reviewer in the Süddeutsche Zeitung who wrote that, "Mahler's trademark is this pared back, quiet, ostensibly casual imagery which gives her work from back then a timeless coolness".

Ostkreuz 
After reunification Ute and Werner Mahler were founder members of the Berlin-based "Ostkreuz" photography agency, which operates under a co-operative ownership structure.   
She later explained the thinking behind the project to an interviewer:  "Everything changed in 1990. Everything was new. Everything. We set up Ostkreuz as a survival strategy ... In those first days we had no idea how to run a [photographic] agency. We couldn't even sort ourselves a fixed telephone line. So we went across to West Berlin and spent 7,000 Marks on a Siemens mobile phone ... [it] was too valuable to leave lying round the office. We took it in turns to drag it home each evening. It was the only way people could contact us.

Over two decades "Ostkreuz" has grown into one of Germany's most successful agencies, despite an underlying ethical basis that rejects the cancerous growth in populism and commercialism that have been features of the period.  Every few years the members take stock of progress, with a new book and exhibition, examining from the perspective of the nation some of the fundamental societal issues of homestead, identity, old age and hope. In 2005 the agency set up its own photographic academy: Mahler became a lecturer.

University-level teaching 
For thirteen years Mahler held a teaching post at the fashion department of the Burg Giebichenstein Kunsthochschule  (loosely. "Burg Giebichenstein Arts Academy") in Halle.   Between 2000 and 2015 she also held a university professorship at the Hamburg University of Applied Arts and Sciences.

Recognition 
A number of Germany's most celebrated public collections hold photographs by Mahler. These include the Berlinische Galerie museum of modern art, photography and architecture, the F. C. Gundlach collection and the German Historical Museum collection in Berlin.

Style 
"Coming from the great and rich so-called 'live photography' tradition, Mahler's visual language is undoubtedly shaped by photo-reportage.   But her own highly original way of seeing things discloses her personality and her concerns far beyond what is to be found in the usual quickly assembled image-based reporting. In determining the precise moment at which a situation becomes uncompromised and communicative, sometimes unexpected, sometimes even puzzling, Mahler moves outside the limits of photography which are generally assumed to be uncrossable.   In her pictures the visible elements provide just a thin outer shell, which quickly melts away  as soon as the interest of the observer in the essential content of the image  is awakened.  That ccntent often comprises elements that mere language can only describe in the vaguest of terms, such as joy, love, loneliness, emptiness and high-spiritedness.   Or frequently some combination of them all.

Awards 

1979: photokina photography prize
2011:  from the Brandenburg lottery fund.

Publications
 Monalisen der Vorstädte: Fotografien von Ute und Werner Mahler. Verlag Meier und Müller, Berlin 2013, . (deutsch, englisch)
 Zusammenleben. Text von Sibylle Berg. Hatje Cantz, Ostfildern 2014, .
 Kleinstadt Fotografien von Ute und Werner Mahler, Hartmann Projects Verlag, Stuttgart 2018,

Exhibitions 
 Zusammen Leben, Porträts von Arbeiterinnen in der DDR, 1984.
 Spurensuche, Galerie Ulrich Kneise, Eisenach, 2008
 Das Geheimnis bleibt, Modefotografie von Ute Mahler und Schülern, Burg Giebichenstein 2011
 Monalisen der Vorstädte- Fotografien von Ute und Wener Mahler. Galerie im Kloster, Obermarchtal 2013.
 Ute Mahler und Werner Mahler – Werkschau, Deichtorhallen, Katalog.

Notes

References 

East German photographers
East German women
Photographers from Berlin
German photojournalists
Documentary photographers
Fashion photographers
20th-century German photographers
21st-century German photographers
20th-century women photographers
21st-century women photographers
Academic staff of the Hamburg University of Applied Sciences
People from Sondershausen
People from Berlin
1949 births
Living people
Women photojournalists